Duke of Benavente is a hereditary title in the Peerage of Spain, accompanied by the dignity of Grandee and granted in 1473 by Henry IV to Rodrigo Alonso Pimentel, 4th Count of Benavente.

Since the Countship of Benavente was not revoked after the concession of the dukedom, the holders of the distinction are technically Count-Dukes of Benavente, similar to the Count-Dukes of Olivares.

Dukes of Benavente (1473)

Rodrigo Alonso Pimentel, 1st Duke of Benavente
Alonso Pimentel y Pacheco, 2nd Duke of Benavente
Antonio Alonso Pimentel y Herrera de Velasco, 3rd Duke of Benavente
Luis Alonso Pimentel Herrera y Enríquez de Velasco, 4th Duke of Benavente
Juan Alonso Pimentel Herrera y Enríquez de Velasco, 5th Duke of Benavente
Antonio Alonso Pimentel y Quiñones, 6th Juan Alonso Pimentel Herrera y Enríquez de Velasco
Juan Francisco Pimentel y Ponce de León, 7th Duke of Benavente
Antonio Alonso Pimentel y Herrera Zúñiga, 8th Duke of Benavente
Francisco Casimiro Pimentel de Quiñones y Benavides, 9th Duke of Benavente
Antonio Francisco Pimentel de Zúñiga y Vigil de Quiñones, 10th Duke of Benavente
Francisco Alonso Pimentel Vigil de Quiñones Borja Aragón y Centelles, 11th Duke of Benavente
María Josefa Pimentel, 12th Duchess of Benavente
Francisco de Borja Téllez-Girón y Alfonso-Pimentel, 13th Duke of Benavente
Pedro de Alcántara Téllez-Girón y Beaufort-Spontin, 14th Duke of Benavente
Mariano Téllez-Girón y Beaufort-Spontin, 15th Duke of Benavente
Pedro de Alcántara Téllez-Girón y Fernández de Santillán, 16th Duke of Benavente
Ángela María Téllez-Girón y Duque de Estrada, 17th Duchess of Benavente
Ángela María de Solís-Beaumont y Téllez-Girón, 18th Duchess of Benavente

See also
List of dukes in the peerage of Spain
List of current Grandees of Spain

References 

Dukedoms of Spain
Grandees of Spain
Lists of dukes
Lists of Spanish nobility
Noble titles created in 1370
Noble titles created in 1473